Dylan Christie (born November 6, 2003) is an American racing driver. He currently competes in the U.S. F2000 National Championship with DEForce Racing. Christie previously competed in the championship with Turn 3 Motorsport in 2021.

Career

U.S. F2000 National Championship 
On January 8, 2021, it was announced that Christie would compete in the U.S. F2000 National Championship for Turn 3 Motorsport in 2021. He finished 15th in the championship. 

In 2022, Christie would switch to DEForce Racing.

Racing record

Career summary 

* Season still in progress.

American open-wheel racing results

U.S. F2000 National Championship 
(key) (Races in bold indicate pole position) (Races in italics indicate fastest lap) (Races with * indicate most race laps led)

* Season still in progress.

References 

2003 births
Living people
Racing drivers from New Jersey
U.S. F2000 National Championship drivers
People from Princeton, New Jersey